Tom Ian Hinley (born 5 February 2003) is an English cricketer. In October 2018, Hinley was named the Sussex under-15 player of the year. He made his first-class debut on 12 September 2021, for Sussex in the 2021 County Championship.

References

External links
 

2003 births
Living people
English cricketers
Sussex cricketers
Cricketers from Frimley